Dva (stylised form: DVA) is the second studio album by English musician Emika. It was released on 10 June 2013 by Ninja Tune Records. The album's title derives from the Czech word for "two".

Track listing

Personnel
Credits adapted from the liner notes of Dva.

 Emika – vocals, engineering, mixing, production
 Paul Batson – arrangement ("Hush Interlude", "Dem Worlds")
 B.M. Horska – translation ("Hush Interlude")
 Michaela Šrůmová – soprano vocals ("Hush Interlude")
 The City of Prague Philharmonic Orchestra – strings ("Hush Interlude", "Dem Worlds")
 Miriam Němcová – conducting ("Hush Interlude", "Dem Worlds")
 Jan Holzner – engineering ("Hush Interlude", "Dem Worlds")
 Stáňa Vomáčková – translator ("Hush Interlude", "Dem Worlds")
 James Fitzpatrick – orchestra contractor ("Hush Interlude", "Dem Worlds")
 Tom Wilding – trumpet ("Young Minds")
 Ljova – viola, viola composition ("Primary Colours", "Mouth to Mouth")
 Christopher Lockington (Deafkid) – guitar, guitar composition ("Criminal Gift")
 Hank Shocklee – executive production
 Jo-Ann Nina – executive production management
 Hue Jah Fink – mastering
 Michael Hain – design, layout
 Madison – photography
 Simon Skevington – A&R

References

2013 albums
Emika albums
Ninja Tune albums